Salihe Aydeniz (born 1973, Ergani, Turkey)  is a Turkish politician from Kurdish descent of the Democratic Regions Party (DBP) and a current member of the Grand National Assembly of Turkey. Since November 2019, she is the co-chair of the DBP.

Education and early life 
She received her primary education in Ergani, Diyarbakır and graduated as a nurse from the health institute in Diyarbakır. Following she worked as a nurse in Dargeçit, Mardin. She also presided over the Trade Union of Public Employees in Health and Social Services and was a member of the Democratic Society Congress (DTK).

Political career 
She was elected to the Grand National Assembly of Turkey representing the HDP for Diyarbakır in the Parliamentary Election in June 2018. On the 30 November 2019, she assumed as a Co-Chair of HDPs sister-party the DBP following which she left the HDP. With her membership of the DBP, the party became the 10th party represented in the Turkish Parliament. As an MP she is for a solution for a political solution for the Kurdish-Turkish conflict and supports that the Turkish opposition makes a more constructive approach to the Kurdish demands on Kurdish language and culture. She doesn't go to Ankara often and laments that the demands for an improvement of the human rights in the Turkish Kurdistan are seldom answered in the Turkish Parliament.

Legal prosecution 
After a march in support of Abdullah Öcalan, the leader of the Kurdistan Workers' Party (PKK) in Kadıköy, she punched a police officer while the officer was only standing. After that she was accused of having pushed a police officer and taking part in a march without permission following which a motion was prepared to end her legislative immunity.

Personal life 
She is married and has two children.

References 

1973 births
Living people
People from Ergani
Turkish nurses
Turkish Kurdish politicians
Turkish Kurdish women
Democratic Regions Party politicians
Members of the 27th Parliament of Turkey
Deputies of Diyarbakır